Maveh may refer to:
 Maveh, Andimeshk (موه)
 Maveh, Izeh (ماوه - Māveh)